Miroslav Jantek (born 8 October 1968) is a former Slovak football defender and currently manager of Partizán Bardejov.

External links
 Futbalnet profile

References

1968 births
Living people
Slovak footballers
Association football defenders
Slovak Super Liga players
FC Lokomotíva Košice players
1. FC Tatran Prešov players
ŠK Futura Humenné players
FC Petržalka players
MFK Vranov nad Topľou players
FK Slavoj Trebišov players
FC Arsenal Tula players
Expatriate footballers in Russia
1. FC Tatran Prešov managers
Slovak football managers